Roderic H. Davison (April 27, 1917March 23, 1996) was an American historian of the Middle East who taught at George Washington University from 1947 to 1993. He served as president of the Middle East Studies Association and the Turkish Studies Association, and as treasurer of the American Historical Association.

Life
Born in Buffalo, New York, the son of an academic at Robert College, Davison grew up in Istanbul. He graduated from Princeton University in 1937 and gained a masters and PhD in history from Harvard University. In 1947 he began teaching courses at George Washington University, on Near Eastern and European diplomatic history and on the Ottoman Empire for over 40 years. Becoming professor in 1954, he retired in 1993.

Davison died of respiratory illness on March 23, 1996, at Sibley Memorial Hospital.

Books 
Reform in the Ottoman Empire 1856–1876, Gordian Press (June 1973), 
Essays in Ottoman and Turkish History, 1774–1923, Saqi Books (2001), 
Turkey: A Short History, The Eothen Press (1998),

Further reading 
D. Mehmet BURAK.Prof. Dr. Roderick Davison

References

1917 births
1996 deaths
Harvard Graduate School of Arts and Sciences alumni
20th-century American historians
American male non-fiction writers
Princeton University alumni
George Washington University faculty
Historians of Turkey
20th-century American male writers